Leptospermum spectabile is a species of shrub that is endemic to a small area of New South Wales. It has thin bark, narrow elliptic leaves, dark red flowers arranged singly on short side shoots and relatively large fruit.

Description
Flowering mainly occurs from October to November and the fruit is a capsule  in diameter with the remains of the sepals attached. The fruit remains on the plant at maturity.

Taxonomy
Leptospermum spectabile was first formally described in 1989 by Joy Thompson in the journal Telopea, based on plant material collected in the Colo River gorge to the north-west of Windsor.

Distribution and habitat
This teatree is only known from the Colo River, where it grows near sandstone rocks on the river bank.

Use in horticulture
This species is relatively easy to grow and its red flowers make this a desirable garden feature. It is readily propagated from both seed and cuttings.

References

spectabile
Myrtales of Australia
Flora of New South Wales
Plants described in 1989
Taxa named by Joy Thompson